The canton of Colombes-2 is an administrative division of the Hauts-de-Seine department, in northern France. It was created at the French canton reorganisation which came into effect in March 2015. Its seat is in Colombes.

Political representation

Composition 

The canton of Colombes-2 consists of the following communes:

 The entirety of the communes of Bois-Colombes and La Garenne-Colombes.
 The part of the commune of Colombes not included in the Canton of Colombes-1, consisting of mostly the neighbourhoods of la Petite Garenne and Les Vallées.

References

Cantons of Hauts-de-Seine